Earth 2140 is a 2D real-time strategy computer game created in 1997 by Polish-based Reality Pump Studios and published by TopWare Interactive (later acquired by Zuxxez Entertainment). It has two sequels, Earth 2150 and Earth 2160.

Plot
Earth 2140 takes place in the year 2140. Previous wars have left much of the Earth a nuclear wasteland, forcing most of the world's population into underground cities. Tensions rise between the Earth's two major factions, the Eurasian Dynasty (ED) and the United Civilized States (UCS), as both sides vie for the world's steadily dwindling resources. A UCS raid on an ED base is enough to ignite the rivalry into full-scale war as the ED fails in its bid to control Mexico and the UCS counterattacks Scandinavia, Great Britain, France, and the Iberian Peninsula.

Factions
The United Civilized States (UCS) controls all of North and South America, Western Europe and North Africa. His nation is populated mostly by hedonists. As much work as possible is done by robots. Automated butlers are the standard in UCS households, even politics and war are left up to the machines. As such, UCS citizens are often portrayed by their detractors as decadent "pigs". A glitch in the upgrade of the UCS war processor GOLAN caused the giant robot to miscalculate the military strength of the Eurasian Dynasty, thus compelling it launch an attack on the ED. After losing several battles in Mexico, GOLAN quickly adapted to the ED threat and began to retake lost ED territory and win battles in Europe. The UCS is generally more technologically advanced than its adversary, employing robot infantry and automated bipedal combat vehicles (more commonly known as mechas).

The Eurasian Dynasty (ED) controls Eastern Europe and Asia. The antithesis of the UCS, the ED is run by an autocratic monarchy under the Khan Dynasty that often makes life harsh, short, and without luxury for its citizens. As the less technologically advanced of the two factions, the ED utilizes cyborgs, traditional vehicles such as tanks, and armed helicopters in its arsenal. Because of its technological disadvantage, the ED finds itself more often on the defensive throughout the Earth 2140 storyline.

Gameplay
Earth 2140 basically requires the player to complete various objectives, mostly destroying all opposing units and structures (or capturing them). Failure of missions happens when all the player's units are wiped out or a vital objective is not met. Structures are built by deploying mobile vehicles on suitable terrain. Mines used to fund the player with money for purchasing can only be built where ore is available. Materials used to gain funds at 1000 credits a piece are carried from a mine (or material on ground) by a BANTHA truck or Heavy Lifter and placed at the Refinery and converted into credits. Mines eventually finish when all ore is extracted.

Units and vehicles can be recruited from their respective factories. Each faction has four types of units, with an exception to the civils who don't serve any purpose but garrison. The player can create up to 5 queued units and even an infinite queue of the same unit. Unlike most strategy games, credits cannot be refunded when recruitment is cancelled and structures cannot be sold. In some missions it is possible for the player to call for reinforcements only once. Structures can only be removed with self-destruction. All structures except the Construction Center require power from power plants. Lack of power will cause buildings to operate slowly. Destruction of a power plant leaves a permanent scar on the terrain, which drains vitality of any units nearby. Certain types of buildings must be built to enable the player to build others and to recruit more types of units and vehicles, especially the Research Center. To capture an enemy structure, the player must send in enough units to overwhelm enemy units in garrison. Capturing the opposing faction's factories enables the player to make use of otherwise unavailable technology (depending on the research center progress). Guard towers and superweapon launchers cannot be captured. Most of the units and vehicles just move, attack and escort, but certain ones serve with special tasks such as mine laying, cargo carrying and others. Not every vehicle is land-based; vehicles like submarines are sea-based and vehicles like helicopters are air-based. Air-based vehicles can travel anywhere on the map screen and while they are airborne can only be shot down by rocketry. A unique feature in the game is that a vehicle once disabled (easily accomplished with ion technology) can be reprogrammed to join the player using a HMCR repair vehicle.

Expansion packs
Two expansion packs were released for this game:
Earth 2140: Mission Pack 1
Earth 2140: Mission Pack 2 - Final Conflict

Reception

References

External links
InsideEarth - Earth 21xx Community

Earth 2140 on Steam

1997 video games
Amiga games
DOS games
Classic Mac OS games
Post-apocalyptic video games
Real-time strategy video games
Video games developed in Poland
Video games with expansion packs
Windows games
Video games set in the 22nd century
Video games set in Africa
Video games set in the Czech Republic
Video games set in Egypt
Video games set in the United Kingdom
Video games set in the United States
Video games set in Finland
Video games set in Norway
Video games set in Scotland
Video games set in Italy
TopWare Interactive games
Multiplayer and single-player video games
World War III video games